"Rest Your Love on Me" is a country ballad performed by the Bee Gees written and sung by Barry Gibb. It was the B-side of the US No. 1 hit "Too Much Heaven". Andy Gibb recorded the song as a duet with Olivia Newton-John for his 1980 album After Dark.

Recording
"Rest Your Love on Me" was written by Barry Gibb in 1976 and recorded it on May 2 on the Children of the World sessions. Stephen Stills played bass on its original demo.

It was not used until "Too Much Heaven" was released, as "Rest Your Love on Me" was chosen as the B-side. As a country song, it did not fit in with what the Bee Gees were putting on their albums, even though they continued to write the occasional country song, like "Where Do I Go", also left off the forthcoming album.

Release
By itself, it reached #39 on the country charts in the United States, their only appearance in the Country Top 40 as artists (though Barry and Maurice also performed and played on 1983's country chart-topping "Islands in the Stream"). The single was a double A in the United Kingdom, France, Scandinavia, Ireland and in Belgium. Later in 1979 it was included in the compilation album Bee Gees Greatest, which rose #1 on the Billboard album charts.

The Osmonds, themselves beginning a transition from a pop/rock band to country music, recorded the song under Maurice Gibb's direction shortly before the Bee Gees released their version, but not released until afterward. In January 1979, Andy Gibb and Olivia Newton-John would perform it at the Music for UNICEF Concert, the first time most people heard it.

Credits and personnel
Barry Gibb – vocals, guitar
Stephen Stills – bass
Blue Weaver – keyboards, synthesiser, piano
Dennis Bryon – drums
 Karl Richardson – sound engineer
 Nick Blacona – engineer

Conway Twitty version

"Rest Your Love on Me" was recorded by Conway Twitty in 1980 for his album of the same name. It was his 25th number one on the country chart as a solo artist. The single went to number one for one week and spent a total of ten weeks within the top 40.

Charts

Other versions
 Andy Gibb and Olivia Newton-John had performed a duet version of "Rest Your Love on Me" at the UNICEF show in January 1979, so she agreed to record it as a new song for Andy's third album After Dark, Albhy Galuten winces recalling the session years later. This song was released as a single in South Africa and elsewhere.
 The Osmonds recorded this song from their album Steppin' Out released in that year also produced by Maurice Gibb.
 Rhythm Sound, a Surinamese group, recorded "Rest Your Love on Me" in their own language.

References

1976 songs
1978 singles
1981 singles
Bee Gees songs
Conway Twitty songs
Andy Gibb songs
Olivia Newton-John songs
Songs written by Barry Gibb
Song recordings produced by Barry Gibb
Song recordings produced by Robin Gibb
Song recordings produced by Maurice Gibb
Song recordings produced by Ron Chancey
Song recordings produced by Albhy Galuten
MCA Records singles
Country ballads